Mick Spain (1932 - 5 February 2011) was an Irish hurler who played at senior level for the Offaly county team.

Born in Kilcormac, County Offaly, Spain first arrived on the inter-county scene at the age of sixteen when he first linked up with the Offaly minor team before later joining the junior side. He made his senior debut during the 1954 championship. Spain went on to play a key role for Offaly but enjoyed little success.

At club level Spain had a lengthy career with Kilcormac–Killoughey.

Throughout his career Spain made 8 championship appearances for Offaly. His retirement came following the conclusion of the 1963 championship.

In retirement from playing Spain became involved in refereeing at club and inter-county levels.

References

1932 births
2011 deaths
All-Ireland Senior Hurling Championship Final referees
ESB people
Hurling referees
Kilcormac-Killoughey hurlers
Offaly inter-county hurlers